Thomas Laybourn (born 30 September 1977) is a retired badminton player from Denmark. He is a World Champion, two times European Champion and was ranked as world number 1 in the mixed doubles in January 2011.

Career 
Laybourn won the 2006 European Badminton Championships in the mixed doubles with partner Kamilla Rytter Juhl. He also competed at the 2006 IBF World Championships in mixed doubles (with Juhl), and were defeated in the quarterfinals by Nathan Robertson and Gail Emms 14–21, 17–21.

Laybourn made his first appearance at the Olympic Games in 2008 Beijing in the mixed doubles event with Juhl. They defeated Singaporean pair Hendri Kurniawan Saputra and Li Yujia in the first round, but lost to Flandy Limpele and Vita Marissa of Indonesia in the quarter finals with a close rubber games.

His biggest success was the title in the 2009 World Championships in the mixed doubles with partner Kamilla Rytter Juhl. It was the first Danish World Championships win since 2003 when Lars Paaske and Jonas Rasmussen won the men's doubles competition.

In 2012, Laybourn played at the London Olympics, reaching in to the quarter finals stage with Partner Juhl. The duo beat Valiyaveetil Diju and Jwala Gutta of India, Lee Yong-dae and Ha Jung-eun of South Korea, and defeated by Tontowi Ahmad and Liliyana Natsir of Indonesia to stand as runners-up in Group C. They then lost to eventual gold medalists Zhang Nan and Zhao Yunlei of China in the quarter finals in straight games. After the London Olympic, Laybourn retired from the international competitions.

Laybourn created a site named Badminton Famly to share knowledge, opinions, and tips about badminton. Badminton Famly also active on several platforms such as YouTube, Instagram, and Facebook.

Achievements

BWF World Championships 
Mixed doubles

European Championships 
Mixed doubles

BWF Superseries 
The BWF Superseries, which was launched on 14 December 2006 and implemented in 2007, is a series of elite badminton tournaments, sanctioned by the Badminton World Federation (BWF). BWF Superseries levels are Superseries and Superseries Premier. A season of Superseries consists of twelve tournaments around the world that have been introduced since 2011. Successful players are invited to the Superseries Finals, which are held at the end of each year.

Mixed doubles

  BWF Superseries Finals tournament
  BWF Superseries Premier tournament
  BWF Superseries tournament

BWF Grand Prix 
The BWF Grand Prix had two levels, the BWF Grand Prix and Grand Prix Gold. It was a series of badminton tournaments sanctioned by the Badminton World Federation (BWF) which was held from 2007 to 2017. The World Badminton Grand Prix sanctioned by International Badminton Federation (IBF) from 1983 to 2006.

Men's doubles

Mixed doubles

  BWF Grand Prix Gold tournament
  BWF & IBF Grand Prix tournament

IBF International 
Men's doubles

Mixed doubles

Record against selected opponents 
Mixed doubles results with Kamilla Rytter Juhl against Superseries Final finalists, Worlds Semi-finalists, and Olympic quarterfinalists.

  He Hanbin & Yu Yang 0–1
  Tao Jiaming & Zhang Yawen 0–2
  Zhang Nan & Zhao Yunlei 1–0
  Zheng Bo & Ma Jin 1–3
  Zheng Bo & Gao Ling 0–4
  Zhang Jun & Gao Ling 1–0
  Xu Chen & Ma Jin 1–2
  Chen Hung-ling & Cheng Wen-hsing 0–1
  Jens Eriksen & Mette Schjoldager 2–0
  Joachim Fischer Nielsen & Christinna Pedersen 1–3
  Nathan Robertson & Gail Emms 3–4
  Anthony Clark & Donna Kellogg 1–1
  Nathan Robertson & Jenny Wallwork 4–1
 / Chris Adcock & Imogen Bankier 1–0
  Michael Fuchs & Birgit Michels 2–2
  Valiyaveetil Diju & Jwala Gutta 3–0
  Flandy Limpele & Vita Marissa 1–2
 / Hendra Setiawan & Anastasia Russkikh 1–0
  Nova Widianto & Liliyana Natsir 5–10
  Tontowi Ahmad & Liliyana Natsir 1–3
  Hendra Aprida Gunawan & Vita Marissa 2–1
  Ko Sung-hyun & Ha Jung-eun 1–2
  Lee Yong-dae & Lee Hyo-jung 1–4
  Koo Kien Keat & Wong Pei Tty 2–1
  Robert Mateusiak & Nadieżda Zięba 4–0
  Hendri Saputra & Li Yujia 4–0
  Sudket Prapakamol & Saralee Thungthongkam 4–1

References

External links 
 Official site
 

1977 births
Living people
Sportspeople from Copenhagen
Danish male badminton players
Badminton players at the 2008 Summer Olympics
Badminton players at the 2012 Summer Olympics
Olympic badminton players of Denmark
World No. 1 badminton players